Helen Guillette Vassallo is an American scientific researcher, educator, author, lecturer, and business leader noted for her contributions to the fields of physiology, pharmacology, and anesthesia.

Education 
In 1949, Vassallo graduated as the valedictorian from Attleboro High School in Massachusetts. While in high school, she won Honorable Mention in the Westinghouse Science Talent Search.  She went on to Tufts University to earn a Bachelor of Science in biology and a Master of Science in pharmacology. In 1967, Vassallo earned her doctorate in physiology from Clark University. A few years later, she received her Master of Business Administration degree from Worcester Polytechnic Institute (WPI).

Career 
Vassallo was the second woman faculty member at WPI, and later was the second woman to be named full professor there. Vassallo spent 20 years in the private sector, joining Astra Pharmaceutical Products as a researcher, eventually becoming the director of scientific and professional information. In 1967, while on loan from Clark University, Vassallo began teaching molecular biology as an adjunct professor in WPI's chemistry department. In 1982, Vassallo left the corporate world to join WPI as a full-time professor of management and an adjunct professor in the Biology Department. She was the first woman to be elected secretary of the faculty, the highest faculty post at the university. Vassallo was also an advisor to the Phi Sigma Sigma sorority, an advisor for freshmen women, and a mentor for new young women faculty members at WPI. Additionally, she served as a member of the President's Council for the Advancement of Women and Minorities, chief justice of the Campus Hearing Board, and chair of the Committee of the Status of Women, established in 1996.

Selected publications 
Covino, B., & Vassallo, H. (1976). Local anesthetics : mechanisms of action and clinical use. New York: Grune & Stratton. 
Nevis, E., Lancourt, J., & Vassallo, H. (1996). Intentional revolutions : a seven-point strategy for transforming organizations (1st ed.). San Francisco, Calif: Jossey-Bass. 
Vassallo, H., & Lanasa, J. (1990). The effects of cognitive style on the design of expert systems. (simulation of human intelligence in the design of expert systems or computers). Review of Business, 12(3), 37.
Morishima, H., Finster, M., Pedersen, H., Fukunaga, A., Ronfeld, R., Vassallo, H., & Covino, B. (1979). Pharmacokinetics of Lidocaine in Fetal and Neonatal Lambs and Adult Sheep. Anesthesiology, 50(5), 431–436. doi: 10.1097/00000542-197905000-00011
Adams, H., Blair, M., Boyes, R., Lebeaux, M., & Vassallo, H. (1978). THERAPEUTICAL COMPOSITIONS.

Awards and honors 
 National Woman of the Year by the American Businesswomen's Association
Worcester Polytechnic Institute Board of Trustees’ Award for Outstanding Teaching in 2003
 Worcester Polytechnic Institute Woman of Courage award by WPI's Women's Program in 2008
Women of Consequence award from the Office of the City Manager's Commission on the Status of Women in Worcester in 2008

External links 

 Vassallo, H. [TEDx Talks] (2014, May 10). Leadership -- challenge or chore: Helen Vassallo at TEDxWPI [Video file]. Retrieved from https://www.youtube.com/watch?v=3QLfCpWfy-o

References 

Worcester Polytechnic Institute alumni
Worcester Polytechnic Institute faculty
Clark University alumni
Tufts University
Tufts University School of Arts and Sciences alumni
Living people
Year of birth missing (living people)
People from Attleboro, Massachusetts
Worcester Polytechnic Institute